Daniel Schutzmann is a half-Israeli actor. He is a fan of football and a big Arsenal Football Club fan. He is most popular for his role as Italian football player, Salvatore Biagi, on the ITV drama, Footballers' Wives and for his role as Marty Green in BBC Scotland River City.

Schutzmann has also appeared in a number of episodes of the Australian soap opera Neighbours during a storyline filmed in London. He played another footballer Pete Gartside, the boyfriend of Izzy Hoyland (played by Natalie Bassingthwaighte

Recently he has appeared as a waiter in Coronation Street in scenes involving Carla Connor's hen party.

His most recent role was playing Dr. Franc Christophe in the daytime soap Doctors.

External links
 
 Interview with BBC Scotland

British male television actors
Living people
Year of birth missing (living people)